Kola Adewusi is a Nigerian politician, who has served as deputy governor of Osun State since 2022. Adewusi was elected deputy governor in the 2022 Osun State gubernatorial election.

References 

21st-century Nigerian politicians
Year of birth missing (living people)
Living people
Peoples Democratic Party (Nigeria) politicians